Arthur Ashe and Robert Lutz won the title, defeating John Newcombe and Tony Roche 6–3, 6–7, 6–3 in the final.

Seeds

  Tom Okker /  Marty Riessen (semifinals)
  Roy Emerson /  Rod Laver (quarterfinals)
  Ken Rosewall /  Fred Stolle (semifinals)
  John Alexander /  Phil Dent (quarterfinals)

Draw

Draw

External links
 Draw

U.S. Pro Indoor
1972 Grand Prix (tennis)